Acme is a rural village in Whatcom County, Washington, United States. There is a general store, post office, gas station, diner, elementary school and two churches located there.  Acme is also included in, and the source-name for, a larger census-designated place (CDP).  The Census Bureau no longer tracks the population for the village itself, but for the entire CDP the population was 246 at the 2010 census.

Acme is located in the South Fork Valley between the northern Cascade Mountains and Lake Whatcom. Acme is locally known as a scenic area with a number of camping opportunities along Lake Whatcom, including the Lake Whatcom Railroad.

History
There are two accounts on how Acme was named.

The first states that Acme was named by Samuel Parks around 1887 after the name of a hymnal in his possession.

The second claims that in 1887, resident George Parls named the town after a local church's newly received Acme hymn book.

Either way, the English word acme is from a Greek word meaning culmination or top or highest point.

Geography
Acme is located at  (48.715402, -122.209954).

According to the United States Census Bureau, the CDP has a total area of 9.8 square miles (25.4 km2), all of it land.

Demographics
As of the census of 2000, there were 263 people, 82 households, and 66 families residing in the CDP. The population density was 26.8 people per square mile (10.4/km2). There were 88 housing units at an average density of 9.0/sq mi (3.5/km2). The racial makeup of the CDP was 93.16% White, 3.80% from other races, and 3.04% from two or more races. Hispanic or Latino of any race were 4.94% of the population.

There were 82 households, out of which 53.7% had children under the age of 18 living with them, 61.0% were married couples living together, 9.8% had a female householder with no husband present, and 19.5% were non-families. 13.4% of all households were made up of individuals, and 4.9% had someone living alone who was 65 years of age or older. The average household size was 3.20 and the average family size was 3.52.

In the CDP, the age distribution of the population shows 37.6% under the age of 18, 8.4% from 18 to 24, 28.5% from 25 to 44, 19.8% from 45 to 64, and 5.7% who were 65 years of age or older. The median age was 30 years. For every 100 females, there were 90.6 males. For every 100 females age 18 and over, there were 90.7 males.

The median income for a household in the CDP was $41,964, and the median income for a family was $48,854. Males had a median income of $52,708 versus $0 for females. The per capita income for the CDP was $17,147. None of the families and 13.2% of the population were living below the poverty line.

Notable people 

 Ann Anderson – former member of Washington State Senate
 Paul Brass – noted scholar of ethnic politics and Indian politics

References

Census-designated places in Washington (state)
Census-designated places in Whatcom County, Washington